Steve Denton and Ivan Lendl were the defending champions, but none competed this year. Lendl opted to focus on the singles tournament.

Anders Järryd and Hans Simonsson won the title by defeating Hans Gildemeister and Andrés Gómez 6–1, 6–4 in the final.

Seeds

Draw

Finals

Top half

Bottom half

References

External links
 Official results archive (ATP)
 Official results archive (ITF)

1981 Grand Prix (tennis)